István Molnár (9 October 1937 – 29 January 1999) was a Hungarian volleyball player. He competed in the men's tournament at the 1964 Summer Olympics.

References

External links
 

1937 births
1999 deaths
Hungarian men's volleyball players
Olympic volleyball players of Hungary
Volleyball players at the 1964 Summer Olympics
Sportspeople from Debrecen